Richard Frederick "Dick" Murphy (born November 14, 1931) is an American competition rower and Olympic champion. He was born in New Jersey. Murphy won a gold medal in coxed eights at the 1952 Summer Olympics, as a member of the American team.

References

1931 births
Living people
American male rowers
Rowers at the 1952 Summer Olympics
Olympic gold medalists for the United States in rowing
Medalists at the 1952 Summer Olympics